Ananya Bhat is an Indian playback singer who primarily sings in Kannada and Telugu. Through her singing career, she is the recipient of Filmfare Award for the song "Namma Kaayo Devan", of the film Rama Rama Re... at 64th Filmfare Awards South in 2017.

Early life and career
Born in Ankali, Belagavi district, she was raised in Mysuru, Karnataka. She is currently residing in Bengaluru. 

Bhat is the singer in songs Garbadhi (solo), Sidila Bharava, Dheera Dheera and Koti Kanasugalu, of the multi-lingual film KGF. She has recorded songs in all four South-Indian languages and also in Hindi.

Previously she worked for a playback "Namma Kaayo Devane" in Rama Rama Re... (2016). In 2018 she sang "Hold On" & "Mental Ho Jawa" songs in Tagaru. Out of two the former song "Hold On" gave her the SIIMA 2019 for best female playback singer -Kannada and a Best Playback Singer – Female Nomination at 66th Filmfare Awards South. She also did her Telugu debut singing for "Yettagayya shiva" in Aatagadharaa Siva which also garnered her Best Playback Singer – Female Nomination at 66th Filmfare Awards South. She sang "Sojugada Sooju Mallige" a Kannada folk song live at the Mahashivaratri event held by Isha foundation in 2020. Ananya appeared in an episode of Kannadathi, a Kannada daily soap, as herself.

As singer

Music video

Television

References

Living people
Kannada playback singers
Singers from Karnataka
Kannada people
Telugu playback singers
Indian women playback singers
Filmfare Awards South winners
Women musicians from Karnataka
21st-century Indian singers
Film musicians from Karnataka
21st-century Indian women singers
Musicians from Mysore
1993 births